EuroCity, abbreviated as EC, is a cross-border train category within the European inter-city rail network. In contrast to trains allocated to the lower-level "IC" (InterCity) category, EC trains are international services that meet 20 criteria covering comfort, speed, food service, and cleanliness. Each EC train is operated by more than one European Union or Swiss rail company, under a multilateral co-operative arrangement, and all EC trains link important European cities with each other.

The EuroCity label replaced the older Trans Europ Express (TEE) name for border-crossing trains in Europe. Whereas TEE services were first-class only, EuroCity trains convey first and second class coaches. The EuroCity schedule was designed with train pairs running one train in both directions, thus resulting in a more frequent service than the TEE, which normally ran only once a day.

Criteria

The criteria EuroCity trains are required to meet include the following:
 train through two or more countries
 all cars air-conditioned
 stop only at stations serving major cities
 stops scheduled to last no more than five minutes, in special cases up to 15 minutes
 food and beverages available onboard (preferably from a dining car)
 conductors speak at least two languages, one of which must be English, French, or German
 average speed (including stops) above , exceptions for routes including mountainous terrain and train ferries
In 1993 it was decided that EuroCity trains must complete their journey between 6:00 am and midnight. The night services are operated as EuroNight since 23 May 1993.

Names
Originally all EuroCity trains carried names, and many still do, continuing the practice started with luxury trains of the late 19th and early 20th centuries. The names are printed on brochures showing the times of arrival and departure at every stop and details of the journey; these are placed on the seats by the train staff. A few trains have used the names of the earlier Trans Europ Express or InterCity trains that they replaced on the same route, for example Iris for Brussels to Zürich. The names were mostly related to the cities and region the trains served and chosen from historical or mythological figures, geographical and botanical names or regional products. 
In 1991, the decision was made to name the EuroCity services after famous Europeans, which in some cases resulted in the renaming of existing services, e.g. the EC trains between Germany and Denmark.

On 29 July 1991, the European Community decided to reorganise the legal structure of the railways in order to stimulate commercial operation and reduce government subsidies. The directive, in force in 1993, stated that railway services and infrastructure should be split and operators should be able to offer their services everywhere in Europe using the national infrastructure. After 20 years the implementation is still ongoing, but it has affected the railway operators already. High-speed services that have been introduced subsequently, using both new rolling stock and some newly built line sections, have all used brand names that are applied to all trains of their class or category, rather than naming every single service.  As a consequence of this trend, the named EC trains on the Paris–Brussels–Amsterdam route disappeared in 1995–96, replaced by unnamed TGV trains and later by Thalys service. Between the Netherlands and Germany the Intercity-Express (ICE) was introduced in 2000, resulting in the near disappearance of the EuroCity brand on those train routes, and with it the use of train names. For marketing reasons, the four EuroCity services between Germany and Poland were advertised as the Berlin–Warszawa Express effective 29 September 2002, thus marketing a product instead of naming individual trains. Preparations for privatisation of Deutsche Bahn led to the discontinuation of names for the EuroCity services in Allgäu on 15 December 2002, and for the other German-operated EC trains on 12 December 2004. The French–Swiss TGV services lost their individual names on 17 May 2003, when "Lyria" was chosen as the brand name used collectively for those TGVs. After the collapse of Cisalpino on 13 December 2009, the named trains between Italy and Switzerland disappeared as well. Farther east, all EC services continue to carry names.

EuroCity-Express

From December 2017, the label is supplemented by the new classification EuroCity Express (ECE). Initially, this will only be used for a single service; the Frankfurt (Main) to Milan service operated by SBB with their ETR 610 high-speed tilting train.

This classification is only used in Germany; in Switzerland and Italy, these trains run as EC. This is due to tariff reasons: in Germany, EC normally are classified below ICE, the highest class, and thus slightly cheaper. ECE however are the same rank as ICE, and are priced as such, as the Deutsche Bahn claims them to provide similar levels of comfort.

Network

On 31 May 1987 the EuroCity network started with 64 EuroCity trains, serving 200 cities in 13 countries. They were made up of 56 day services and eight night services. The network included the international TGVs between France and Switzerland, shown in orange on the 1987 map. Night services are shown in blue on the map, with the exception of the boat-train Benjamin Britten (London–Amsterdam), whose overnight portion was by ferry, not by train. The other EuroCity trains are shown in green on the map. The TEE Gottardo is shown in red on the map, because it was converted to EuroCity only one year later. Three international InterCity trains did not qualify as EuroCity and are shown on the map in grey.

The network was set up by the national railways of Norway, Sweden, Austria, Switzerland, and the European Community. One year later Hungary joined as well. The network grew from 64 services in 1987 to 76 services in 1990, and in 1991 the frequency was improved, resulting in an expansion to 102 services by 1991. Until then it was a mainly West European network but from 1991 it began expanding beyond Hungary in the east. After the historic developments occurring in Central and Eastern Europe regarding the fall of Communism around that time, Yugoslavia and Czechoslovakia became part of the system in 1991, and Poland in 1992. In the following years Czechoslovakia and later Yugoslavia were split and their parts became individual members too. In 1993 the night services were rebranded as the EuroNight network, the start of a gradual decline in the number of EuroCity trains in Western Europe. When high-speed lines opened in France, Italy, Spain, Germany, and Belgium/Netherlands/Luxembourg, the EuroCity services were replaced by high-speed trains, mostly with their own brands and therefore not classified as EuroCity. In Central and Eastern Europe more services were introduced, and over a period of 25 years the centre of the EC network had shifted east.

Operation
During the pre-Schengen era, passport checks were conducted on EC trains while in motion, rather than while parked at a station or requiring the passengers to disembark, as was sometimes the case for non-EC trains. A few require pre-reservation (though this is possible and recommended for all other trains) and in some countries a supplemental charge.

List of EuroCity services

See also
 EuroCity in Germany
 EuroNight
 Train categories in Europe

References

Notes

Further reading

External links

 7 new railways companies on Open Access 2013 – Mediarail.be

 
Rail transport brands
Rail transport in Europe
Transport and the European Union
International named passenger trains
Railway services introduced in 1987